The 2016–17 Burkinabé Premier League is the 55th edition of top flight football in Burkina Faso. It began on 25 November 2016 and concluded on 30 July 2017.

Standings

References

Premier League
Premier League
Burkina Faso
Burkinabé Premier League seasons